The Mack is a 1973 American blaxploitation film directed by California native Michael Campus, starring Max Julien and Richard Pryor. The film also stars Oscar-nominee Juanita Moore and Tony-nominated actor Dick Anthony Williams. Filmed in Oakland, California the movie follows the rise and fall of Goldie, on whose return from a five-year prison sentence finds that his brother is involved in Black nationalism. Goldie decides to take an alternative path, striving to become the city's biggest pimp.

Though reviews were less than favorable upon initial release, The Mack is considered by many critics to be the best entry in its genre. The film is often categorized as blaxploitation, but Michael Campus, Max Julien, and others involved in its production have argued that the genre label oversimplifies the film.

The film's soundtrack was recorded by Motown artist Willie Hutch.

Plot
After returning home from a five-year prison sentence, John "Goldie" Mickens has a plan to achieve money and power in Oakland, California by becoming a pimp. Goldie's criminal ways contrast with his brother Olinga's Black Nationalist efforts to save the community from drugs and violence. With Slim as his partner and Lulu as his head prostitute, he organizes a team of women and quickly rises to prominence. His success catches the attention of Fat Man, the heroin kingpin that Goldie worked for before heading to prison, and Hank and Jed, two corrupt and racist white detectives. Goldie refuses to work for Fat Man again, and dismisses the detectives' requests to stop his brother from ridding the streets of drugs. As a result, his mother is assaulted which eventually leads to her death. Even though Olinga is disappointed in Goldie because he "brought death to their house," he agrees to help him get revenge. They develop a plan with Slim to seek revenge, but their plans fall apart when Hank and Jed kill Slim at their rendezvous point. They reveal that they are responsible for Goldie's mother's death, causing Goldie and Olinga to kill them both. Realizing that one of his hookers, "Chico", snitched him out to Hank and Jed, he attempts to shoot her but then holds back and leaves. Oakland is now too dangerous and Goldie hugs his brother goodbye and heads out of town on a charter bus.

Cast

Production
Production for the film started from early September to late December 1972. According to director Michael Campus, the original script for the film was written on prison toilet paper by Bobby Poole, an inmate at San Quentin. While staying in Oakland for two months, Campus met Frank Ward, a real pimp and drug dealer from Oakland. Max Julien's character of Goldie is based upon him. In order to shoot the movie, Campus needed Ward's permission, because many scenes were filmed in his territory. In exchange for his guidance and protection, Campus put Ward in the film. All of the homeless people, junkies, pimps and women in the film were supplied by Frank Ward.

Although Campus had Ward's protection, the film was also in Black Panther territory. During filming, Black Panther party members would throw bottles and trash cans from rooftops. In order for filming to run smoothly, an additional deal had to be made with Huey Newton and Bobby Seale, who were then put in charge of providing extras for the film. About halfway through the production of the film, Frank Ward was shot and killed while in his Rolls-Royce. There was speculation that the Black Panthers were responsible for Ward's death, and the filmmakers and cast relocated to safer areas for filming. Despite the tension, the film's opening was shot in Oakland with all of the proceeds going to the Black Panthers' breakfast program.

Reception
The film was screened in theaters in only about 20 mostly black communities. Distributors avoided theaters in predominantly white neighborhoods due to a belief the film would do better in black areas. Despite its low distribution, director Michael Campus has noted that the film outgrossed The Godfather in the cities in which it played.

Alternate score
In its original 1973 release by Cinerama Releasing and its 1978 reissue by AIP, The Mack featured a score by Willie Hutch, an artist and producer for Motown Records. In 1983, Producers Distributing Corporation reissued the film to capitalize on the resurgent popularity of Richard Pryor and Roger Mosley, who was co-starring on the hit TV series Magnum P.I. PDC commissioned a new score by Alan Silvestri featuring vocals by Gene McDaniels. The reissue poster advertised a soundtrack release on Posh Boy Records, but the album was released on the ALA Enterprises label; it is now out of print and highly collectible. To differentiate it from the original score, fans have referred to it as "The Mack and His Pack," based on a catch phrase used on the reissue poster. When the film was initially licensed to Embassy Pictures for home video, it included the Silvestri score. The New Line DVD release restored the original Willie Hutch score to the film.

References in popular culture
 In a scene in the 1993 film True Romance, The Mack is playing on a TV screen in the background when Clarence Worley (played by Christian Slater) confronts Drexl Spivey (played by Gary Oldman).
The film's theatrical poster is spoofed in the 2012 Teenage Mutant Ninja Turtles fifth-season episode "The Curse of Savanti Romero".

References to soundtrack
 Dr. Dre sampled “Brother's Gonna Work It Out” in “Rat-Tat-Tat-Tat” from the album The Chronic.
 Usher sampled "Mack's Stroll/The Getaway (Chase Scene)" in "Superstar" from the album Confessions. 
 Chance the Rapper sampled "Brother's Gonna Work It Out" in "Lost (ft. Noname Gypsy)."
 Chief Keef also sampled "Brother's Gonna Work It Out" in "Nobody", a collaboration with Kanye West.
 A$AP Mob also sampled "Brother's Gonna Work It Out" in "Put That On My Set", from their collaborative album Cozy Tapes: Vol. 1: Friends.
 UGK heavily sampled "I Choose You" in their 2007 song "International Players Anthem (I Choose You)" featuring Outkast, from the album Underground Kingz. The song peaked at number 70 on the US Billboard Hot 100. Prior to this, the song was sampled by Project Pat for his 2002 song "Choose U", from the album Layin' da Smack Down. Both "Choose U" and "International Players Anthem" were produced by DJ Paul and Juicy J from Three 6 Mafia.

References

External links
 
 

1973 films
1970s crime drama films
American crime drama films
Blaxploitation films
Films directed by Michael Campus
Films set in Oakland, California
Cinerama Releasing Corporation films
1973 drama films
1970s English-language films
1970s American films